is a professional Japanese ice hockey player for Vortex Sapporo and the Japanese national team. Fujimoto was previously a starting goaltender for the New York Riveters of the National Women's Hockey League (NWHL).

Career
Fujimoto participated at the 2015 IIHF Women's World Championship and was named best goalkeeper of the tournament.

Fujimoto was signed by the New York Riveters of the National Women's Hockey League on 27 July 2015. Fujimoto played as the starting goaltender for the franchise's first season and was selected as a starter for the 2016 All-Star Game. Fujimoto did not return to the NWHL for the 2016/17 season due to her obligations towards the Japanese national team.

Fujimoto competed at both the 2014 and the 2018 Winter Olympics.

References

External links

1989 births
Living people
Japanese expatriate ice hockey people
Ice hockey players at the 2014 Winter Olympics
Ice hockey players at the 2018 Winter Olympics
Ice hockey players at the 2022 Winter Olympics
Japanese women's ice hockey goaltenders
Japanese expatriate sportspeople in the United States
New York Riveters players
Olympic ice hockey players of Japan
Sportspeople from Sapporo
Competitors at the 2015 Winter Universiade
Universiade bronze medalists for Japan
Universiade medalists in ice hockey
Asian Games medalists in ice hockey
Ice hockey players at the 2007 Asian Winter Games
Ice hockey players at the 2017 Asian Winter Games
Medalists at the 2007 Asian Winter Games
Medalists at the 2017 Asian Winter Games
Asian Games gold medalists for Japan
Asian Games silver medalists for Japan